The 34th National Hockey League All-Star Game was held in Capital Centre in Landover, home to the Washington Capitals, on February 9, 1982. This was the first All-Star game played with geographically-aligned rosters following the NHL's realignment before the season started.

Uniforms 
With the exception of the 1979 Challenge Cup, the NHL All-Stars had worn the same uniform design since 1973, itself a modification of a design that had dated back to 1964. For the 1982 game hosted in the suburbs of the United States capital, the NHL decided to introduce new uniforms featuring dozens of stars scattered across the base-colored section of the jersey. The new design also featured triangular side panels on the body of the jersey in a contrasting color that was also used on the lower sleeves - orange on the white jersey worn by the Wales team, and black on the orange jersey worn by the Campbell team. In addition, the names on the back of the jerseys were radially arched, with additional stars added at either end of the player's name.

Team Lineups

Game summary

Goaltenders :
 Campbell : Fuhr (30:23), Meloche (29:37)
 Wales  : Dion (30:23), Edwards (29:37)

Shots on goal :
Campbell (28) 17 - 05 - 06
Wales (31) 08 - 16 - 07

Referee : Wally Harris

Linesmen : Ron Finn, Swede Knox

MVP: Mike Bossy, (New York Islanders)

See also
1981–82 NHL season

References

All
National Hockey League All-Star Games
National Hockey League All-Star Game
National Hockey League All-Star Game